The Constitutional Court is the highest authority in Benin on matters of constitutionality. Composed of seven justices, it is the body that regulates the functioning of government institutions and the activities of public figures. The court was founded in 1993. Its domicile is in Cotonou.

History 
As part of Benin's transition to democracy in 1990 a conference was held to draft a new Constitution which provided limitations and separation of government powers and which created institutions that worked with one another to guarantee protection of fundamental freedoms and public freedoms.

The Constitutional Court was one of these institutions. It was founded out of a desire to have a political regime free of dictatorship and unjust, arbitrary decision-making. Instead, the goal was to have a democratic, pluralist government in which human rights, public freedom, human dignity and justice are guaranteed, protected and promoted.  Installed on June 7, 1993, the court is seen as the protector of the Constitution and respecter of the laws of the Republic.

The court mainly judges the constitutionality of laws, serves as the guarantor of fundamental rights and public liberties, and serves as the regulatory organ for the proper functioning of institutions, the legality of elections and referendums, and serve as a judge in election disputes between members of the National Assembly.

Composition 
The Court is composed of seven justices, four of which are nominated by the National Assembly and three by the President of the Republic. Justices serve a five-year term that can be renewed one time. Of those Justices, the court is made up of the following:

 Three Magistrates with at least fifteen years experience. Two nominated by the National Assembly and one by the President.
 Two high-level jurists, professors or law practitioners with at least fifteen years experience. One nominated by the National Assembly and one by the President,
 Two professionals with good reputations. One each nominated from the National Assembly and the President.

The President of the court is elected among the sitting magistrate and jurist members of the court.

Members of the Constitutional Court are ineligible to be Ministers of the Republic, run for elective office, or other public, civil, military or professional work.

Current members of the court were sworn in on 6 June 2018 in Sèmè City in front of the National Assembly, the President, members of the government and institutions, foreign delegations and families of the court members.

The court was previously composed of professor  Théodore Holo and six other members. Marcelline Gbêha-Afouda served as the vice-president.

List of presidents of the Constitutional Court 
Since its creation in 1993, the court has had five presidents (of which two were women): Élisabeth Pognon from 1993 to 1998 and Conceptia Ouinsou from 1998 to 2008.

Referral procedure

In cases of constitutionality 

 A referral is opened by any citizens for laws, regulations, administrative acts and the violations of fundamental rights and public liberties.
 Before a law can be promulgated or a regulation be applied, members of the National Assembly, the President and heads of government institutions can refer a case to the court. 
 For authorization and ratification of international agreements, the President or the National Assembly can refer it to the court.
 In cases of human rights/public liberty violations, the court is authorized to take the case and decides the outcome Ex officio
 In electoral matters
 Before the election: Any citizen can refer a case to the court provided that there are no limitations in the electoral law.
 After the election: Electoral complaints will be declared inadmissible before results have been proclaimed because it is premature. 
 Any complaint related to voting on election day must include evidence provided by voters and sent to the court.
 After Proclamation of Results: 
 After the results have been announced, the type of the election determines the response of the court
 With Legislative Elections, cases can be referred to the court by people registered on the electoral list or candidates from the constituency where the election took place within ten days of the proclamation of results by the Constitutional Court (pursuant to Article 55 of Organic Law 91-009). 
 Any complaint received after the ten day period is considered inadmissible (except for special cases).
 In the first round of Presidential elections, any candidate can open a complaint
 During the second round of presidential elections, only the top two candidates may open complaints.
 For a Constitutional Advisory decision: Only the President of the Republic or the President of the National Assembly may ask the court for an advisory decision on constitutionality. Thus, no private citizen may refer an advisory case to the Court.

Decisions

Controversy on the right to strike 
Since the creation of the court, its decisions on the right of Beninese workers to strike have been controversial. This is due to differing interpretations of Article 31 of the Constitution:

According to a decision by then Chief Justice Conceptia Ouinsou, any law that forbids strikes is unconstitutional. The court under Chief Justice Théodore Holo ruled similarly in a January 2018 decision. However, the court under Robert Dossou and Joseph Djogbenou have rendered decisions in favor of forbidding strikes from certain categories of workers.

Dangnivo Affair 
The court was also referred a case by defendants in the Dangnivo Affair, following a long pre-trial detention. The court determined on January 23, 2020, that the length of pretrial detention without a lower court ruling of guilt constituted a violation of the defendants rights to a speedy trial.,.

References

Bibliography 

 Frédéric Joël Aïvo (dir.), en collaboration avec le Centre de droit constitutionnel, Jurisprudence électorale commentée : la présidentielle de 2016 devant la Cour constitutionnelle du Bénin, les éditions universitaires, Cotonou, 2017, 202 p. 
 Oladé Okunlola Moïse Laleye, La Cour constitutionnelle et le peuple au Bénin : d'un juge constitutionnel institué à un procureur suzerain, L'Harmattan, Paris, 2018, 683 p. Éric M. Ngango Youmbi, La justice constitutionnelle au Bénin : logiques politique et sociale, L'Harmattan, 2016, 694 p.

External links 

 Official site 

Organizations established in 1993
Constitutional courts